Cliffdell is an unincorporated community in Yakima County, Washington, United States, located approximately 23 miles west of Ellensburg.

The community was originally named Spring Flats and in 1920, was renamed to Cliffdell in honor of Cliff and Della Schott of Seattle. The Schott's were friends of homesteader Russell Davison who developed much of the town for summer homes. Cliffdell was the site of a temporary army camp once used by Captain William O. Slaughter in 1855.

References

External links
Whistlin' Jack Lodge

Census-designated places in Washington (state)
Census-designated places in Yakima County, Washington
Unincorporated communities in Yakima County, Washington
Unincorporated communities in Washington (state)